In enzymology, an alpha,alpha-trehalose-phosphate synthase (UDP-forming) is an enzyme that catalyzes the chemical reaction

UDP-glucose + D-glucose 6-phosphate  UDP + alpha,alpha-trehalose 6-phosphate

Thus, the two substrates of this enzyme are UDP-glucose and D-glucose 6-phosphate, whereas its two products are UDP and alpha,alpha'-trehalose 6-phosphate.

This enzyme belongs to the family of glycosyltransferases, specifically the hexosyltransferases.  The systematic name of this enzyme class is UDP-glucose:D-glucose-6-phosphate 1-alpha-D-glucosyltransferase. Other names in common use include UDP-glucose-glucose-phosphate glucosyltransferase, trehalosephosphate-UDP glucosyltransferase, UDP-glucose-glucose-phosphate glucosyltransferase, alpha,alpha-trehalose phosphate synthase (UDP-forming), phosphotrehalose-uridine diphosphate transglucosylase, trehalose 6-phosphate synthase, trehalose 6-phosphate synthetase, trehalose phosphate synthase, trehalose phosphate synthetase, trehalose phosphate-uridine diphosphate glucosyltransferase, trehalose-P synthetase, transglucosylase, and uridine diphosphoglucose phosphate glucosyltransferase.  This enzyme participates in starch and sucrose metabolism.

Structural studies

References

 
 
 
 

EC 2.4.1
Enzymes of known structure